Journey Ahead is a 1947 British film starring Howard Douglas, Nora Gordon and Ruth Haven, and written by Warren Tute.

References

External links

1947 films
British black-and-white films